Italian irredentism was a nationalist movement during the late nineteenth and early twentieth centuries in Italy with irredentist goals which promoted the unification of geographic areas in which indigenous peoples considered to be ethnic Italians and/or Italian-speaking individuals formed a majority, or substantial minority, of the population.

At the beginning, the movement promoted the annexation to Italy of territories inhabited by Italian indigenous population, but retained by the Austrian Empire after the Third Italian War of Independence in 1866. These included Trentino, but also multilingual and multiethnic areas within the northern Italian region encompassed by the Alps, with German, Italian, Slovene, Croatian, Ladin and Istro-Romanian population, such as South Tyrol, Trieste, a part of Istria, Gorizia and Gradisca and part of Dalmatia. The claims were extended also to the city of Fiume, Corsica, the island of Malta, the County of Nice and Italian Switzerland.

During the Risorgimento in 1860, the Prime Minister of the Kingdom of Sardinia Camillo Benso, Count of Cavour, who was leading the unification effort, faced the view of French Emperor Napoleon III who indicated that France would support militarily the Italian unification provided that France was given Nice and Savoy that were held by Sardinia, as France did not want a powerful state having control of the passages of the Alps. As a result, Sardinia was pressured to cede Nice and Savoy to France in exchange for France accepting the sending of troops to help the unification of Italy.

To avoid confusion and in line with convention, this article uses modern English place names throughout. However, most places have alternative names in Italian. See List of Italian place names in Dalmatia.

Characteristics 

Italian irredentism was not a formal organization but rather an opinion movement, advocated by several different groups, claiming that Italy had to reach its "natural borders" or unify territories inhabited by Italians. Similar nationalistic ideas were common in Europe in the late 19th century. The term "irredentism", coined from the Italian word, came into use in many countries (see List of irredentist claims or disputes). This idea of Italia irredenta is not to be confused with the Risorgimento, the historical events that led to irredentism, nor with nationalism or Imperial Italy, the political philosophy that took the idea further under fascism.

During the 19th century, Italian irredentism fully developed the characteristic of defending the Italian language from other people's languages like, for example, German in Switzerland and in the Austro-Hungarian Empire or French in Nice and Corsica.

The liberation of Italia irredenta was perhaps the strongest motive for Italy's entry into World War I and the Treaty of Versailles in 1919 satisfied many irredentist claims.

Italian irredentism has the characteristic of being originally moderate, requesting only the return to Italy of the areas with Italian majority of population, but after World War I it became aggressive – under fascist influence – and claimed to the Kingdom of Italy even areas where Italians were a minority or had been present only in the past. In the first case there were the Risorgimento claims on Trento, while in the second there were the fascist claims on the Ionian Islands, Savoy and Malta.

Origins 

The Corsican revolutionary Pasquale Paoli was called "the precursor of Italian irredentism" by Niccolò Tommaseo because he was the first to promote the Italian language and socio-culture (the main characteristics of Italian irredentism) in his island; Paoli wanted the Italian language to be the official language of the newly founded Corsican Republic. 

Pasquale Paoli's appeal in 1768 against the French invader said:
{{quote|We are Corsicans by birth and sentiment, but first of all we feel Italian by language, origins, customs, traditions; and Italians are all brothers and united in the face of history and in the face of God ... As Corsicans we wish to be neither slaves nor "rebels" and as Italians we have the right to deal as equals with the other Italian brothers ... Either we shall be free or we shall be nothing... Either we shall win or we shall die (against the French), weapons in hand ... The war against France is right and holy as the name of God is holy and right, and here on our mountains will appear for Italy the sun of liberty|Pasquale Paoli}}

Paoli's Corsican Constitution of 1755 was written in Italian and the short-lived university he founded in the city of Corte in 1765 used Italian as the official language.

After the Italian unification and Third Italian War of Independence in 1866, there were areas with Italian-speaking communities within the borders of several countries around the newly created Kingdom of Italy. The irredentists sought to annex all those areas to the newly unified Italy. The areas targeted were Corsica, Dalmatia, Gorizia, Istria, Malta, County of Nice, Ticino, small parts of Grisons and of Valais, Trentino, Trieste and Fiume.

Different movements or groups founded in this period: in 1877 the Italian politician Matteo Renato Imbriani invented the new term terre irredente ("unredeemed lands"); in the same year the movement Associazione in pro dell'Italia Irredenta ("Association for the Unredeemed Italy") was founded; in 1885 was founded the Pro Patria movement ("For Fatherland") and in 1891 the Lega Nazionale Italiana ("Italian National League") was founded in Trento and Trieste (in the Austrian Empire).

Initially, the movement can be described as part of the more general nation-building process in Europe in the 19th and 20th centuries when the multi-national Austro-Hungarian, Russian and Ottoman Empires were being replaced by nation-states. The Italian nation-building process can be compared to similar movements in Germany (Großdeutschland), Hungary, Serbia and in pre-1914 Poland. Simultaneously, in many parts of 19th-century Europe liberalism and nationalism were ideologies which were coming to the forefront of political culture. In Eastern Europe, where the Habsburg Empire had long asserted control over a variety of ethnic and cultural groups, nationalism appeared in a standard format.  The beginning of the 19th century "was the period when the smaller, mostly indigenous nationalities of the empire – Czechs, Slovaks, Slovenes, Croats, Serbs, Ukrainians, Romanians – remembered their historical traditions, revived their native tongues as literary languages, reappropriated their traditions and folklore, in short, reasserted their existence as nations".

 19th century 

In the early 19th century the ideals of unification in a single Nation of all the territories populated by Italian-speaking people created the Italian irredentism. Many Istrian Italians and Dalmatian Italians looked with sympathy towards the Risorgimento movement that fought for the unification of Italy. 

The current Italian Switzerland belonged to the Duchy of Milan until the 16th century, when it became part of Switzerland. These territories have maintained their native Italian population speaking the Italian language and the Lombard language, specifically the Ticinese dialect. Italian irredentism in Switzerland was based on moderate Risorgimento ideals, and was promoted by Italian-Ticinese such as Adolfo Carmine.

Following a brief French occupation (1798–1800) the British established control over Malta while it was still formally part of the Kingdom of Sicily. During both the French and British periods, Malta officially remained part of the Sicilian Kingdom, although the French refused to recognise the island as such in contrast to the British. Malta became a British Crown Colony in 1813, which was confirmed a year later through the Treaty of Paris (1814). Cultural changes were few even after 1814. In 1842, all literate Maltese learned Italian while only 4.5% could read, write and/or speak English. However, there was a huge increase in the number of Maltese magazines and newspapers in the Italian language during the 1800s and early 1900s, so as a consequence the Italian was understood (but not spoken fluently) by more than half the Maltese people before WW1.

The Kingdom of Sardinia again attacked the Austrian Empire in the Second Italian War of Independence of 1859, with the aid of France, resulting in liberating Lombardy. On the basis of the Plombières Agreement, the Kingdom of Sardinia ceded Savoy and Nice to France, an event that caused the Niçard exodus, that was the emigration of a quarter of the Niçard Italians to Italy. Giuseppe Garibaldi was elected in 1871 in Nice at the National Assembly where he tried to promote the annexation of his hometown to the newborn Italian unitary state, but he was prevented from speaking. Because of this denial, between 1871 and 1872 there were riots in Nice, promoted by the Garibaldini and called "Niçard Vespers", which demanded the annexation of the city and its area to Italy. Fifteen Nice people who participated in the rebellion were tried and sentenced.

In the spring of 1860 Savoy was annexed to France after a referendum and the administrative boundaries changed, but a segment of the Savoyard population demonstrated against the annexation. Indeed, the final vote count on the referendum announced by the Court of Appeals was 130,839 in favour of annexation to France, 235 opposed and 71 void, showing questionable complete support for French nationalism (that motivated criticisms about rigged results). At the beginning of 1860, more than 3000 people demonstrated in Chambéry against the annexation to France rumours. On 16 March 1860, the provinces of Northern Savoy (Chablais, Faucigny and Genevois) sent to Victor Emmanuel II, to Napoleon III, and to the Swiss Federal Council a declaration - sent under the presentation of a manifesto together with petitions - where they were saying that they did not wish to become French and shown their preference to remain united to the Kingdom of Sardinia (or be annexed to Switzerland in the case a separation with Sardinia was unavoidable).

In 1861, with the proclamation of the Kingdom of Italy, the modern Italian state was born. On 21 July 1878, a noisy public meeting was held at Rome with Menotti Garibaldi, the son of Giuseppe Garibaldi, as chairman of the forum and a clamour was raised for the formation of volunteer battalions to conquer the Trentino. Benedetto Cairoli, then Prime Minister of Italy, treated the agitation with tolerance. However, it was mainly superficial, as most Italians did not wish a dangerous policy against Austria or against Britain for Malta.

One consequence of irredentist ideas outside of Italy was an assassination plot organized against the Emperor Francis Joseph in Trieste in 1882, which was detected and foiled. Guglielmo Oberdan, a Triestine and thus Austrian citizen, was executed. When the irredentist movement became troublesome to Italy through the activity of Republicans and Socialists, it was subject to effective police control by Agostino Depretis.

Irredentism faced a setback when the French occupation of Tunisia in 1881 started a crisis in French–Italian relations. The government entered into relations with Austria and Germany, which took shape with the formation of the Triple Alliance in 1882. The irredentists' dream of absorbing the targeted areas into Italy made no further progress in the 19th century, as the borders of the Kingdom of Italy remained unchanged and the Rome government began to set up colonies in Eritrea and Somalia in Africa.

 World War I 

Italy entered the First World War in 1915 with the aim of completing national unity: for this reason, the Italian intervention in the First World War is also considered the Fourth Italian War of Independence, in a historiographical perspective that identifies in the latter the conclusion of the unification of Italy, whose military actions began during the revolutions of 1848 with the First Italian War of Independence.

Italy signed the London Pact and entered World War I with the intention of gaining those territories perceived by irredentists as being Italian under foreign rule. According to the pact, Italy was to leave the Triple Alliance and join the Entente Powers. Furthermore, Italy was to declare war on Germany and Austria-Hungary within a month. The declaration of war was duly published on 23 May 1915. In exchange, Italy was to obtain various territorial gains at the end of the war. In April 1918, in what he described as an open letter "to the American Nation" Paolo Thaon di Revel, Commander in Chief of the Italian navy, appealed to the people of the United States to support Italian territorial claims over Trento, Trieste, Istria, Dalmatia and the Adriatic, writing that "we are fighting to expel an intruder from our home".
 
The outcome of the First World War and the consequent settlement of the Treaty of Saint-Germain met some Italian claims, including many (but not all) of the aims of the Italia irredenta party. Italy gained Trieste, Gorizia, Istria and the Dalmatian city of Zara. In Dalmatia, despite the London Pact, only territories with Italian majority as Zadar (Zara) with some Dalmatian islands, such as Cres (Cherso), Lošinj (Lussino) and Lastovo (Lagosta) were annexed by Italy because Woodrow Wilson, supporting Yugoslav claims and not recognizing the treaty, rejected Italian requests on other Dalmatian territories, so this outcome was denounced as a "Mutilated victory". The rhetoric of "Mutilated victory" was adopted by Benito Mussolini and led to the rise of Italian fascism, becoming a key point in the propaganda of Fascist Italy. Historians regard "Mutilated victory" as a "political myth", used by fascists to fuel Italian imperialism and obscure the successes of liberal Italy in the aftermath of World War I.

The city of Rijeka (Fiume) in the Kvarner was the subject of claim and counter-claim because it had an Italian majority, but Fiume had not been promised to Italy in the London Pact, though it was to become Italian by 1924 (see Italian Regency of Carnaro, Treaty of Rapallo, 1920 and Treaty of Rome, 1924). The stand taken by the irredentist Gabriele D'Annunzio, which briefly led him to become an enemy of the Italian state, was meant to provoke a nationalist revival through corporatism (first instituted during his rule over Fiume), in front of what was widely perceived as state corruption engineered by governments such as Giovanni Giolitti's. D'Annunzio briefly annexed to this "Regency of Carnaro" even the Dalmatian islands of Krk (Veglia) and Rab (Arbe), where there was a numerous Italian community.

 Fascism and World War II 
Fascist Italy strove to be seen as the natural result of war heroism against a "betrayed Italy" that had not been awarded all it "deserved", as well as appropriating the image of Arditi soldiers. In this vein, irredentist claims were expanded and often used in Fascist Italy's desire to control the Mediterranean basin. 

To the east of Italy, the Fascists claimed that Dalmatia was a land of Italian culture whose Italians, including those of Italianized South Slavic descent, had been driven out of Dalmatia and into exile in Italy, and supported the return of Italians of Dalmatian heritage. Mussolini identified Dalmatia as having strong Italian cultural roots for centuries via the Roman Empire and the Republic of Venice. The Fascists especially focused their claims based on the Venetian cultural heritage of Dalmatia, claiming that Venetian rule had been beneficial for all Dalmatians and had been accepted by the Dalmatian population. The Fascists were outraged after World War I, when the agreement between Italy and the Entente Allies in the Treaty of London of 1915 to have Dalmatia join Italy was revoked in 1919.

To the west of Italy, the Fascists claimed that the territories of Corsica, Nice and Savoy held by France were Italian lands.Mussolini Unleashed, 1939–1941: Politics and Strategy in Fascist Italy's Last War. Cambridge, England, UK: Cambridge University Press, 1986, 1999. P. 38. The Fascist regime produced literature on Corsica that presented evidence of the island's italianità. The Fascist regime produced literature on Nice that justified that Nice was an Italian land based on historic, ethnic and linguistic grounds. The Fascists quoted Medieval Italian scholar Petrarch who said: "The border of Italy is the Var; consequently Nice is a part of Italy". The Fascists quoted Italian national hero Giuseppe Garibaldi, a native of Nizza (Nice) himself, who said: "Corsica and Nice must not belong to France; there will come the day when an Italy mindful of its true worth will reclaim its provinces now so shamefully languishing under foreign domination". Mussolini initially pursued promoting annexation of Corsica through political and diplomatic means, believing that Corsica could be annexed to Italy through Italy first encouraging the existing autonomist tendencies in Corsica and then the independence of Corsica from France, that would be followed by the annexation of Corsica into Italy.

In 1923, Mussolini temporarily occupied Corfu, using irredentist claims based on minorities of Italians in the island, the Corfiot Italians. Similar tactics may have been used towards the islands around the Kingdom of Italy – through the pro-Italian Maltese, Corfiot Italians and Corsican Italians – in order to control the Mediterranean sea (his Mare Nostrum, from the Latin "Our Sea").

In the 1930s Mussolini promoted the development of an initial italian irredentism in Durres, in order to occupy all Albania later. Durres (called "Durazzo" in italian) has been for centuries during the Middle Ages a city with territory under control of the italian states (Naples, Sicily, Venice) and many italians settled there. In 1938 was created the Durazzo section of the Albania Fascist Party that was formed by some citizens of the city with distant & recent italian roots (they started the local italian irredentism). In 1939 all Albania was occupied and united to the Kingdom of Italy: Italian citizens (more than 11000) began to settle in Albania as colonists and to own land in 1940, so that they could gradually transform it into Italian territory.The italianization of Albania was one of Mussolini's plans.

During World War II, large parts of Dalmatia were annexed by Italy into the Governorship of Dalmatia from 1941 to 1943. Corsica and Nice were also administratively annexed by Italy in November 1942. Malta was heavily bombed, but was not occupied due to Erwin Rommel's request of diverting to North Africa the forces that had been prepared for the invasion of the island.

 Dalmatia 

Dalmatia was a strategic region during World War I that both Italy and Serbia intended to seize from Austria-Hungary. Italy joined the Triple Entente Allies in 1915 upon agreeing to the London Pact that guaranteed Italy the right to annex a large portion of Dalmatia in exchange for Italy's participation on the Allied side. From 5–6 November 1918, Italian forces were reported to have reached Vis, Lastovo, Šibenik, and other localities on the Dalmatian coast. By the end of hostilities in November 1918, the Italian military had seized control of the entire portion of Dalmatia that had been guaranteed to Italy by the London Pact and by 17 November had seized Fiume as well. In 1918, Admiral Enrico Millo declared himself Italy's Governor of Dalmatia. Famous Italian nationalist Gabriele d'Annunzio supported the seizure of Dalmatia and proceeded to Zadar in an Italian warship in December 1918.

The last city with a significant Italian presence in Dalmatia was the city of Zara (now called Zadar). In the Austro-Hungarian census of 1910, the city of Zara had an Italian population of 9,318 (or 69.3% out of the total of 13,438 inhabitants). In 1921 the population grew to 17,075 inhabitants, of which 12,075 Italians (corresponding to 70,76%). 

In 1941, during the Second World War, Yugoslavia was occupied by Italy and Germany. Dalmatia was divided between Italy, which constituted the Governorate of Dalmatia, and the Independent State of Croatia, which annexed Dubrovnik and Morlachia. After the Italian surrender (8 September 1943) the Independent State of Croatia annexed the Governorate of Dalmatia, except for the territories that had been Italian before the start of the conflict, such as Zara. In 1943, Josip Broz Tito informed the Allies that Zadar was a chief logistic centre for German forces in Yugoslavia. By overstating its importance, he persuaded them of its military significance. Italy surrendered in September 1943 and over the following year, specifically between 2 November 1943 and 31 October 1944, Allied Forces bombarded the town fifty-four times. Nearly 2,000 people were buried beneath rubble: 10–12,000 people escaped and took refuge in Trieste and slightly over 1,000 reached Apulia. Tito's partisans entered Zadar on 31 October 1944 and 138 people were killed. With the Peace Treaty of 1947, Italians still living in Zadar followed the Italian exodus from Dalmatia and only about 100 Dalmatian Italians now remain in the city.

 Post-World War II 

Under the Treaty of Peace with Italy, 1947, Istria, Kvarner, most of the Julian March as well as the Dalmatian city of Zara was annexed by Yugoslavia causing the Istrian-Dalmatian exodus, which led to the emigration of between 230,000 and 350,000 of local ethnic Italians (Istrian Italians and Dalmatian Italians), the others being ethnic Slovenians, ethnic Croatians, and ethnic Istro-Romanians, choosing to maintain Italian citizenship.

After World War II, Italian Irredentism diminished along with the defeated Fascists and the Monarchy of the House of Savoy. After the Treaty of Paris (1947) and the Treaty of Osimo (1975), all territorial claims were abandoned by the Italian State (see Foreign relations of Italy). Today, Italy, France, Malta, Greece, Croatia and Slovenia are all members of the European Union, while Montenegro and Albania are candidates for accession.
	 	 
The often cited the then-Italian Deputy Gianfranco Fini, who in Senigallia in 2004 gave an interview to the Slobodna Dalmacija daily newspaper at the 51st gathering of the Italians who left Yugoslavia after World War II, in which he was reported to have said: "From the son of an Italian from Fiume I learned that those areas were and are Italian, but not because at any particular historical moment our army planted Italians there. This country was Venetian, and before that Roman". Rather than issuing an official rebuttal of those words, Carlo Giovanardi, then Parliamentary Affairs Minister in Berlusconi's government, affirmed Fini's words by saying "that he told the truth".

These sources pointed out that on the 52nd gathering of the same association, in 2005, Carlo Giovanardi was quoted by the Večernji list daily newspaper as saying that Italy would launch a cultural, economic and touristic invasion in order to restore "the Italianness of Dalmatia" while participating in a roundtable discussion on the topic "Italy and Dalmatia today and tomorrow". Giovanardi later declared that he had been misunderstood and sent a letter to the Croatian Ministry of Foreign Affairs in which he condemned nationalism and ethnic strife.
	 	
They underlined that Alleanza Nazionale (a former Italian conservative party) derived directly from the Italian Social Movement (MSI), a neo-fascist party. In 1994, Mirko Tremaglia, a member of the MSI and later of Alleanza Nazionale, described Rijeka, Istria and Dalmatia as "historically Italian" and referred to them as "occupied territories", saying that Italy should "tear up" the 1975 Treaty of Osimo with the former Yugoslavia and block Slovenia and Croatia's accession to European Union membership until the rights of their Italian minorities were respected.
	 
In 2001, Italian president Carlo Azeglio Ciampi gave the gold medal (for the aerial bombings endured during World War II) to the last Italian administration of Zadar (Zara in Italian), represented by its Gonfalone, owned by the association "Free municipality of Zara in exile". Croatian authorities complained that he was awarding a fascist institution, even if the motivations for the golden medal explicitly recalled the contribution of the city to the Resistance against Fascism. The motivations were contested by several Italian right-wing associations, such as the same "Free municipality of Zara in exile" and the Lega Nazionale.
	 	
On 12 December 2007, the Italian post office issued a stamp with a photo of the Croatian city of Rijeka and with the text "Fiume – eastern land once part of Italy" ("Fiume-terra orientale già italiana").B92 – Internet, Radio and TV station  Zagreb protests over Italian stamp Some Croatian sources said that "già italiana" could also mean "already Italian", but according to Italian syntaxis the correct meaning, in this case, is only "previously Italian". 3.5 million copies of the stamp were printed, but it was not delivered by the Italian Post Office in order to forestall a possible diplomatic crisis with Croatian and Slovenian authorities. Nevertheless, some of the stamps leaked out and came in official use, and it became widely known.

Italian irredentism by region

 Italian irredentism in Dalmatia
 Italian irredentism in Istria
 Italian irredentism in Corsica
 Italian irredentism in Nice
 Italian irredentism in Savoy
 Italian irredentism in Malta
 Italian irredentism in Switzerland
 Italian irredentism in Corfu

 Political figures in Italian irredentism 
 Guglielmo Oberdan
 Cesare Battisti
 Nazario Sauro
 Carmelo Borg Pisani
 Giuseppe Garibaldi
 Gabriele D'Annunzio
 Petru Simone Cristofini
 Petru Giovacchini
 Maria Pasquinelli

 Regions historically claimed by Italian irredentism 
 Istria  
 Dalmatia  
 Monaco 
 Nice province 
 Corsica 
 Savoy 
 Malta 
 Ionian Islands 
 Canton Ticino, parts of Canton Vallese and Italian Graubünden 
 San Marino 
 Coastal parts of Vlorë region and Vlorë 
 Palagruža 

 See also 
 Kingdom of Italy
 Istrian-Dalmatian exodus
 Istrian Italians
 Dalmatian Italians
 Niçard exodus
 Niçard Italians
 Italian Empire
 Italian geographical region
 Italian Regency of Carnaro
 Italian unification

 References 
 Citations 

 Sources 
 Bartoli, Matteo. Le parlate italiane della Venezia Giulia e della Dalmazia. Tipografia italo-orientale. Grottaferrata. 1919.
 Colonel von Haymerle, Italicae res, Vienna, 1879 – the early history of irredentists.
 Lovrovici, don Giovanni Eleuterio. Zara dai bombardamenti all'esodo (1943–1947). Tipografia Santa Lucia – Marino. Roma. 1974.
 Petacco, Arrigo. A tragedy revealed: the story of Italians from Istria, Dalmatia, Venezia Giulia (1943–1953). University of Toronto Press. Toronto. 1998.
 Večerina, Duško. Talijanski Iredentizam ("Italian Irredentism"). . Zagreb. 2001.
 Vivante, Angelo. Irredentismo adriatico ("The Adriatic Irredentism"). 1984.

 External links 
 Unredeemed Italy (Google Books)
 Articles on the History of Dalmatia
 Articles on the Italians in Dalmatia
 Articles on Zadar, when was a city of the Kingdom of Italy.
 Slovene – Italian relations between 1880–1918 
  Movimento irredentista italiano Italian irredentist movement
  Hrvati AMAC Gdje su granice (EU-)talijanskog bezobrazluka? (Where are the limits of Italian arrogancy?''; page contains the speech of Italian deputy)
  Slobodna Dalmacija Počasni građanin Zadra kočnica talijanskoj ratifikaciji SSP-a
  D'Annunzio and Rijeka
  Politicamentecorretto.com Guglielmo Picchi Forza Italia
  Italia chiama Italia Francobollo Fiume: bloccata l'emissione
  Trieste.rvnet.eu Stoppato il francobollo per Fiume, bufera: protestano Unione degli istriani, An e Forza Italia (contains the scan of the stamp)

History of Austria-Hungary
History of Istria
History of Dalmatia
History of Malta
Politics of World War II
Politics of World War I
Italy

de:Irredentismus#Italienischer Irredentismus